Plymouth Meeting is a census-designated place (CDP) that straddles Plymouth and Whitemarsh Townships in Montgomery County, Pennsylvania, United States. The settlement was founded in 1686.

The population of Plymouth Meeting was 6,177 in the 2010 census. Plymouth Meeting is home to the Colonial School District, the Plymouth Meeting Mall and several large office parks and shopping centers. It is home to IKEA's U.S. headquarters. The confluence of the Pennsylvania Turnpike (I-276), the Mid-County Expressway/"Blue Route" (I-476) and the Northeast Extension of the Pennsylvania Turnpike (I-476) at the Mid-County Interchange occur in Plymouth Meeting. This interchange contributes to regional commerce and was a major driver for business and retail development.

History
The area was originally settled by members of the Religious Society of Friends, or Quakers, who built the Plymouth Friends Meetinghouse in 1708. They sailed from Devonshire, England, on the ship Desire, arriving in Philadelphia on June 23, 1686. The settlement takes its name from the founders' hometown of Plymouth in Devon.

During the Revolutionary War, in May 1778, the Plymouth Friends Meetinghouse served as a temporary military hospital. General George Washington, then at Valley Forge, learned that a British force intended to seize the area and cut off movement of the Continental Army. He sent Marquis de Lafayette and 2,100 troops to counter. They camped around the meetinghouse on the night before the May 19 Battle of Barren Hill. The next morning the British arrived with a massive force of 16,000, and tried to cut off any escape route. Lafayette instead took advantage of the Americans' knowledge of local roads, and escaped with minimal casualties.

Plymouth Meeting House is the name of a village situated at the intersection of the Plymouth and Perkiomen turnpikes, on the township line.  On this [Plymouth] side is the meeting house, school house and four houses; and in Whitemarsh two stores, a blacksmith and wheelwright shop, post office and twenty-four houses. The houses in this village are chiefly situated along the Perkiomen or Reading pike, nearly adjoining one another, and being of stone, neatly white washed, with shady yards in front, present to the stranger and agreeable appearance. In the basement of the Library building the Methodists hold worship. This is an ancient settlement, whose history dates back nearly to the arrival of William Penn, and is marked as a village on Lewis Evans' map of 1749. The post office was established here before 1827. In 1832 there were but ten houses here. — History of Montgomery County (1858).

Slave holding was condemned by the Society of Friends in 1754. Few slaves were held in Plymouth Township, and only one remained by 1830. The Maulsby and Corson families were early abolitionists, sheltering runaway slaves beginning in the 1810s and turning their properties into stations on the Underground Railroad. The Fugitive Slave Act of 1850 increased the penalties for giving assistance to an escaped slave to six months in prison and a $1,000 fine. It allowed slavecatchers to pursue a fugitive across state lines into every U.S. state and territory. Local resident George Corson was involved in hiding Jane Johnson, whose 1855 escape exposed a loophole in the federal law. When the doors to local churches and schools were closed to Abolitionist speakers, Corson built Abolition Hall (1856) on his farm at Germantown and Butler Pikes. The hall could accommodate up to 200 people, and hosted speakers such as Frederick Douglass, Harriet Beecher Stowe, Lucretia Mott, Mrs. Stephen Foster and William Lloyd Garrison.

In later years (1881-1895) Abolition Hall became the art studio of painter Thomas Hovenden. Married to George Corson's daughter, Helen (Corson) Hovenden, Hovenden was best known for painting realistic scenes taken out of American life as he experienced it in the farmlands of Plymouth Meeting. His depictions of everyday life during the Civil War seem like photographs rather than oil paintings. One of his most famous paintings,“Breaking Home Ties,” (shown below) as well as several others, can be seen in the Philadelphia Museum of Art. Hovenden succeeded Thomas Eakins as the principal painting instructor at the Pennsylvania Academy of Fine Arts in 1886 after the latter was forced to resign for inappropriate use of nude models.

Growth continued for Plymouth Meeting during the 1900s which led to the advent of the Pennsylvania Turnpike, the Plymouth Meeting Mall, high-rise and garden apartment complexes, industries and office buildings.

What is now Germantown Pike was ordered laid out by the Provincial Government in 1687 as a "cart road" from Philadelphia to Plymouth Meeting. The actual road was finished in 1804, at a cost of $11,287. A road from Plymouth Meeting to Gwynedd appears to have been built in 1751. What is now Chemical Road, following Plymouth Creek, was opened in 1759 to provide access to a new gristmill.

In the early 19th century the Hickorytown Hotel, on Germantown Pike opposite Hickory Road, was a prominent road house. Robert Kennedy, an officer in the Revolution, operated the inn in 1801. In 1806 it was kept by Frederick Dull and in 1825, Jacob Hart. In the beginning of the 19th century it was a training place for the 36th Regiment of the Pennsylvania Militia and the Second Battalion of Montgomery County. The Friendship Company for the Protection against Horse Stealing was organized there in 1807. Township elections were held there, and a post office was established there in May 1857. The Plymouth Meeting Post Office appears to have been established sometime prior to 1827.

In 1754, Benjamin Davis received a license to keep an inn on Ridge Pike at Plymouth Creek. This inn, the Seven Stars, was shown on maps as early as 1759. The inn was demolished in 1975 to make way for the Midcounty Expressway.

Early records indicate that one person was elected as "road supervisor" and tax collector. The roads were mostly dirt, and repair and maintenance was often auctioned off to the lowest bidder, usually a farmer who had large properties and kept many men and horses, and the smaller farmers worked on the roads for them.

Tax records show that many taxpayers worked out their taxes on the roads. From 1846 to 1854 the road supervisor was paid one dollar per day for his work as supervisor and collector of taxes. Men working on the roads received $.80 per day and boys received $.40 per day. For the use of a double team of horses with a wagon or cart, one was paid $1.75 per day.

Among early industries in Plymouth Township was the Hickorytown Forge operated by the Wood family, and a forerunner of the present Alan Wood Steel Company. The name Plymouth Furnace appears in the records about 1847 and was engaged in the manufacture of nails.

In 1863, a company named Plymouth Iron Company was organized with a capital of $30,000.00. The company purchased the property of Colwell Furnace, which is located just west of the present Colwell Lane adjoining the development known as Farmview Village.

The Plymouth Railroad was built in 1836 to serve some 20 lime kilns operating along the route between Conshohocken and Cold Point. In 1870, the line was acquired by the Philadelphia and Reading Railroad and was rebuilt and extended to Oreland at a junction with the North Penn Railroad. The line was abandoned by the 1970s.

Prior to the building of the Plymouth Railroad, the Philadelphia, Germantown, and Norristown Railroad was built along the Schuylkill River through Plymouth Township and commenced operation in 1835. For most of its history, this railroad was part of the Reading Railroad system. Today these tracks are SEPTA's Manayunk/Norristown Line.

The Schuylkill Valley Division of the Pennsylvania Railroad was built parallel to the Reading Railroad tracks along the Schuylkill River, opening for service in 1884. Rail service ended in the 1970s and the track-bed is now occupied by the multi-use (pedestrian and bicycle) Schuylkill River Trail.

The Trenton Cutoff branch of the Pennsylvania Railroad was built in 1891. The Trenton Cutoff is now owned by Norfolk Southern and is known as the Morrisville Line.

Later in the 1890s electric trolley lines were built through Plymouth Meeting. The trolleys that ran on the shoulder of Germantown Pike connected Chestnut Hill and Norristown. The trolley on the shoulder of Butler Pike was a short shuttle known as the Harmanville Dinkey, running between Germantown Pike and Ridge Pike (0.7 miles). Dinkey passengers transferred to Conshohocken-bound trolleys at the corner of Ridge Pike and Butler Pike. For most of their existence the trolley lines were operated by the Reading Transit & Light Company (no relation to the Reading Railroad). In addition to passengers, during the 1910s freight was handled by the RT&L trolleys; an abandoned wooden track-side freight platform near the northwest corner of Germantown Pike and Butler Pike survived into the 1950s. The Harmanville Dinkey was replaced with buses in 1927. The Germantown Pike trolleys ceased operation in December 1931. The trolley that ran from Norristown to Conshohocken through Black Horse, Seven Stars and Harmanville was replaced with buses in September 1933. The roadside trolley tracks were quickly torn up and the adjacent two-lane Ridge Pike, and Butler Pike south of Ridge Pike, were widened to accommodate ever-increasing motor vehicle traffic.

The first school in the township was established by the Plymouth Meeting Society of Friends in 1780, although some records indicate an earlier school. A school was established at Cold Point in 1821. Public schools, established under the system authorized by the legislature in 1834, included Cold Point School, Plymouth Valley School, the Eight Square school, the Sandy Hill school and the North Star school.

Plymouth became a township of the first class in January 1922. Isaac J. Sheppard became township secretary from that time until his retirement in 1952. Under the new form of government the board changed from "road supervisors" to "Township Commissioners".

In 1925, the Board of Health was organized. Plumbing inspection began in 1934. In 1939, Plymouth adopted a "modern" zoning ordinance. A building code ordinance was adopted. In 1947, the first subdivision ordinance was adopted. In 1952, the Township Planning Commission was created, and a Recreation Committee was established to study recreation needs.

Plymouth Township adopted a Home Rule Charter in 1972. This allows a municipality to take any governmental or administrative actions it requires, unless such actions are prohibited by general laws of the Commonwealth.

From as early as 1688, lime kilns have been a large, productive and profitable business there.

The Plymouth Meeting Historic District, Alan West Corson Homestead, Plymouth Friends Meetinghouse, and Hovenden House, Barn and Abolition Hall were listed on the National Register of Historic Places in 1971.

Geography

Plymouth Meeting is located primarily within Plymouth Township, with a smaller portion lying within Whitemarsh Township. Plymouth Township is immediately adjacent to the Schuylkill River, but all river frontage is occupied by industry. Currently a bike trail is under development for river access.

Interstate 476 and the Pennsylvania Turnpike pass through the township. The area is easily accessible to Interstate 76 and the "Main Line" points across the river.

Demographics

As of the 2010 census, the CDP was 82.2% Non-Hispanic White, 6.2% Black or African American, 8.4% Asian, 0.6% were Some Other Race, and 1.4% were two or more races. 2.1% of the population were of Hispanic or Latino ancestry.

As of the census of 2000, 5,593 people, 2,215 households, and 1,557 families resided in the CDP. The population density was 1,478.8 people per square mile (571.3/km2) living in 2,285 housing units at an average density of 604.2/sq mi (233.4/km2). The racial makeup of the CDP was 89.34% White, 3.40% African American, 0.09% Native American, 0.29% Asian, 0.14% from other races, and 0.73% from two or more races. Hispanic or Latino of any race were 0.91% of the population.

28.4% of households had children under age 18 living with them, 59.5% were married couples living together, 7.9% had a female householder with no husband present, and 29.7% were non-families. 25.0% of all households were made up of individuals, and 12.1% had someone living alone who was 65 years of age or older. The average household size was 2.49 and the average family size was 3.00.

In the CDP, the population was spread out, with 22.7% under the age of 18, 5.6% from 18 to 24, 28.1% from 25 to 44, 24.2% from 45 to 64, and 19.4% who were 65 years of age or older. The median age was 41 years. For every 100 females, there were 94.8 males. For every 100 females age 18 and over, there were 89.5 males.

The median income for a household in the CDP was $57,601, and the median income for a family was $71,585. Males had a median income of $50,813 versus $38,906 for females. The per capita income for the CDP was $31,254. About 3.0% of families and 4.0% of the population were below the poverty line, including 4.2% of those under age 18 and 4.6% of those age 65 or over.

Notable people
Joseph K. Corson - American Civil War soldier and Medal of Honor winner
Jim Drucker (born 1952/1953) - former Commissioner of the Continental Basketball Association, former Commissioner of the Arena Football League, and founder of NewKadia Comics
 Steve Schlachter (born 1954), American-Israeli basketball player

Attractions 

The historic Plymouth Friends Meetinghouse, built in 1708, is located within the town.

Plymouth Meeting is home to the Plymouth Meeting Mall, which has AMC Theatres adjacent to it, as well as dining and entertainment spots. The largest Whole Foods Market in the Philadelphia area opened on January 12, 2010. Boscov's, Burlington, Dick's Sporting Goods, Michaels, and Edge Fitness serve as the anchor stores to the mall.

Institutions
Plymouth Meeting lies in both Plymouth and Whitemarsh townships. The term Plymouth Meeting generally refers to most of Plymouth Township, as the township's ZIP code is congruent with that of Plymouth Meeting. The Plymouth Meeting post office, however, is actually located just outside Plymouth Township within Whitemarsh Township. The entire area is generally referred to as "Plymouth Whitemarsh", as is the high school.

La Salle University maintains a satellite campus in Plymouth Meeting.

Villanova University maintains its baseball facilities on the grounds of the Greater Plymouth Township Community Center at Villanova Ballpark at Plymouth. The park has a walking trail, sand volleyball courts, indoor basketball and a swimming pool. Concerts are held in the summer, as well as a bocce league.

Plymouth Meeting is the home of Odyssey Fastpitch Softball, a competitive girls travel/tournament softball organization.

Plymouth Township has an extensive park system, including the Greater Plymouth Community Center and 11 parks comprising approximately 149 acres. East Plymouth Valley Park is also located there.

Education
The Colonial School District maintains its headquarters just south of Plymouth Meeting in Whitemarsh Township. Colonial is regarded as one of the top school districts in the state with consistently high standardized testing results. The two townships share a high school with the borough of Conshohocken.

Holy Rosary Regional Catholic School is the area Catholic school. It was formed in 2012 by the merger of Epiphany of Our Lord School in Plymouth Meeting, Our Lady of Victory in East Norriton, and St. Titus in Norristown.

References

External links

 Plymouth/Whitemarsh News & Events

Census-designated places in Montgomery County, Pennsylvania
Census-designated places in Pennsylvania